Pol Moreno Sánchez (born 9 May 1994) is a Spanish footballer who plays for Spanish club Racing Club de Santander as a central defender.

Club career
Born in Barcelona, Barcelona, Catalonia, Moreno graduated from the youth academy of UE Sant Andreu and made his senior debut in 2013–14 season with CD Masnou in Tercera División. At the end of the season, he switched to CE Sabadell FC and was assigned to the reserve team. On 10 March 2016, he renewed his contract till 2018. Ten days later, he made his first team debut, coming on as a substitute for Adrián Díaz in a 1–0 victory against Villarreal CF B. On 14 October 2017, he made his fiftieth appearance for the club in a 1–1 draw against Atlético Saguntino.

On 13 July 2018, Moreno moved abroad and joined Swedish club GIF Sundsvall. Eight days later, he made his debut for the club in a 2–0 victory against Kalmar FF.

References

External links

Pol Moreno at Trayectorias de Fútbol

1994 births
Living people
People from Badalona
Sportspeople from the Province of Barcelona
Spanish footballers
Association football defenders
Primera Federación players
Segunda División B players
Tercera División players
UE Sant Andreu footballers
CD Masnou players
CE Sabadell FC B players
CE Sabadell FC footballers
UE Cornellà players
Racing de Santander players
Allsvenskan players
GIF Sundsvall players
Spanish expatriate footballers
Spanish expatriate sportspeople in Sweden
Expatriate footballers in Sweden